Naples Metropolitan Railway service are two independent companies that operate a commuter rail system in Naples. The first one, Trenitalia, operates line 2 from Pozzuoli Solfatara to Gianturco station in East of Naples. The other one, EAV, operates the Circumvesuviana, Cumana, Circumflegrea and MetroCampania NordEst. In Italy, Naples is the only city possessing two independent metropolitan railway service companies.

Line 2 also has same regional extensions which reach Formia, Capua, Castellamare and Salerno.

History

Trenitalia 
See: Line 2 (Naples metro)
The construction of the line, part of the ″direttissima″ Rome–Naples, was begun in 1911 and after a suspension during World War I, it was completed in 1925 between Pozzuoli and Piazza Garibaldi, electrified with third rail. Two years later the ″direttissima″ was completed, and the electrical rail service was extended towards Villa Literno and Gianturco.[1]

In November 1935 the line was also electrified with overhead line; the third rail was discontinued in 1938.[2]

In 1997, the line was numbered as Line 2, while the proper metro line became Line 1. The two lines were connected with a pedestrian tunnel between Museo and Cavour in 2002.   Operation of Line 2 was transferred to Metronapoli SpA, a newly established joint stock company in which Trenitalia held a 38% stake, but it was transferred back to Trenitalia in November 2005, when Trenitalia sold its Metronapoli shares to the municipal government.

Nowadays the line is crossed by urban trains, and also by regional trains that reach Formia (westbound) and Capua, Castellammare and Salerno (eastbound).

EAV

Circumvesuviana 
See: Circumvesuviana

SEPSA

Cumana railway

Circumflegrea railway

MetroCampania NordEst

Alifana Railway 
The Ferrovia Alifana is a former railroad company of southern Italy. It held public passenger service on the rail line connection Naples to Piedimonte d'Alife (now Piedimonte Matese). In 2005 it was acquired by the MetroCampania NordEst (MCNE), another public company responsible of passenger transport in northern Campania.

The company was inaugurated on March 30, 1913, with a first service held on the line Naples P.zza Carlo III Station-Santa Maria Capua Vetere/S.Andrea dei Lagni-Biforcazione-Capua (43 km), with 11,000 V 25 Hz monophase AC electric traction. Service from Caiazzo to Piedimonte began in 1914, held with steam locomotives. A line from Naples/Secondigliano to Santa Maria Capua Vetere was opened later. Gauge was 935 mm for both lines.

The railway suffered heavy damage during World War II. While the first line was restored in 1963, using standard gauge and diesel traction (later electrified then process abandoned), the railroad from Secondigliano did not receive the same attention, and, despite its high traffic, was closed in 1976 and replaced by bus service.

In 2005 the subway line of the lower part was reopened between Piscinola-Scampia (interchange with Naples Metro line 1) to Mugnano. Then, in 2009, it was extended to Aversa.

Caudina Railway

About

Trenitalia

EAV

Circumvesuviana 
See: Circumvesuviana

Circumvesuviana is a railway company operating services in the East of the Naples metropolitan area. It is entirely separate from other national and regional railway lines.

The Circumvesuviana railway service covers a wide catchment area of over 2 million people, distributed in 47 municipalities, including Scafati, San Valentino Torio and Sarno in the province of Salerno and Avella and Baiano in the province of Avellino. The network forms an important commercial artery, and provides services to the important tourist destinations of Pompeii and Herculaneum.

All routes start from the Napoli Porta Nolana terminus near the Porta Nolana, and pass through Napoli Garibaldi station before splitting into several branches to towns in the province.

On 27 December 2012 the company was absorbed by the Ente Autonomo Volturno.

SEPSA (Cumana and Circumflegrea railways)

Cumana 
The Cumana railway is a commuter railway in Campania, southern Italy, connecting Naples by two separate routes with Torregaveta, near Cuma in the town of Bacoli (about 15 km west of Naples). It passes through Pozzuoli and the volcanic Campi Flegrei area. The line was built and run by the Società per le Ferrovie Napoletane (the Neapolitan Railway Company), founded in 1883, and is now operated by the EAV company.

Circumflegrea 
The Circumflegrea railway is a commuter railway line that connects Naples city centre with the northern Phlegraean Fields, a suburban area located west of the city.

MetroCampania NordEst

Alifana railway 
See: Ferrovia Alifana

Subway lower part 
In 2005, the first section of the new lower Alifana Railway was opened between Naples Metro line 1's Piscinola Station to Mugnano Di Napoli as a subway line. Later, in 2009, it was extended to Aversa, with new stops at Giugliano and Aversa Ippopodromo. Because Aversa is not in the Province of Naples, it's Italy's first interprovincial metro system.

Railway upper part 
The Ferrovia Alifana is a former railroad company of southern Italy. It held public passenger service on the rail line connection Naples to Piedimonte d'Alife (now Piedimonte Matese). In 2005 it was acquired by the MetroCampania NordEst (MCNE), another public company responsible of passenger transport in northern Campania.

The company was inaugurated on March 30, 1913, with a first service held on the line Naples P.zza Carlo III Station-Santa Maria Capua Vetere/S.Andrea dei Lagni-Biforcazione-Capua (43 km), with 11,000 V 25 Hz monophase AC electric traction. Service from Caiazzo to Piedimonte began in 1914, held with steam locomotives. A line from Naples/Secondigliano to Santa Maria Capua Vetere was opened later. Gauge was 935 mm for both lines.

The railway suffered heavy damage during World War II. While the first line was restored in 1963, using standard gauge and diesel traction, the railroad from Secondigliano did not receive the same attention, and, despite its high traffic, was closed in 1976 and replaced by bus service. This move was to be temporary, but only in 2005 a renewed section of the line, connecting Piscinola to Mugnano, was reopened as subway line.

In the same year the whole service on the Alifana railroad was acquired by the new public company MetroCampania NordEst. The company is currently responsible of the service from Santa Maria Capua Vetere station, which had connection with the Trenitalia line to Naples, to Piedimonte Matese, and from Piscinola to Mugnano (to be extended to Teverola). It's currently the remaining unelectrified line of the EAV network, as all other lines are electrified, but because it the electrification started (later abandoned), electrification poles are in place on the railway.

Caudina Railway

Projects

Trenitalia 
An extension of line 2 from Gianturco to San Giovanni is currently under construction and it's expected to be operational after 2017. The new extension includes Ferraris station (which is under construction) and a proposed station called Vigliena.

Naples Metro line 8 will run from Leopardi station to Torregaveta, connecting the Trenitalia network with the Cumana Railway via 3 new stops in a tunnel at Campegna, Cederna and Coroglio.

Ente Autonomo Volturno

Circumvesuviana

SEPSA 
Naples Metro line 7 will run in a circular line connecting the Cumana and Circumflegrea railways via 4 new stops at Monte Sant'Angelo, Parco San Paolo, Terracina and Giochi del Mediterraneo. The existing station Zoo-Edenlandia will be renamed as Kennedy.

A branch of the Circumflegrea railway from Licola to Giugliano has been approved, construction has not yet started.

MetroCampania NordEst 

The Alifana Railway, a mix of Subway and Heavy Rail, reopened the lower part of the section as subway line (running from Naples Metro line 1 Piscinola Station to Aversa). They are plans to connect the unelectrified upper part (running from Santa Maria Capua Vetere to Piedimonte Matese) with the lower part subway line, between them and converting the upper part to subway standards. The connection between Aversa and Santa Maria Capua Vetere is currently under construction but work for converting the upper part into a subway line has not yet started.

The lower part (which is a Subway Line) is also being extended from Piscinola to Naples International Airport which will share tracks with Metro's line 1. A new station, Melito, between Giugliano and Mugnano is completed but not yet open.

Rolling Stock

Trenitalia

Ente Autonomo Volturno

Circumvesuviana

Image gallery

SEPSA

Image gallery

MetroCampania NordEst 
Alifana railway:
Subway lower part:
 Former Rome Metro line A 100 series (known as MA 100)
Unelectrified upper part:
 Railcar ALn 668 and ALn 663 built by Fiat Ferroviaria (now Alstom) in Savigliano

Caudina railway:
 Firema E 82 ET400 series EMU like those used on the Cumana and Circumflegrea railways.

Image gallery

See also 
 Line 2 (Naples Metro)
 Circumvesuviana

References

External links 
 http://www.trenitalia.it (available in English) for the Trenitalia network
 http://www.eavcampania.it/web/en for the EAV network

Transport in Naples
Regional rail in Italy